Mitja Viler (born 1 September 1986) is a retired Slovenian footballer who played as a left-back. He spent his entire career in his homeland Slovenia, making over 400 appearances in the Slovenian top division with Koper and Maribor.

At international level, he earned two caps for the Slovenian national team in 2017.

Club career
Viler started playing football when his father, who was also a football player and later a coach, introduced him to the game. Earlier in career, he was a utility player and played on several different positions. Before moving to Maribor in 2010, he played for Koper and made a total of 142 appearances for the club in the Slovenian first division, 1. SNL, scoring five goals in the process. He was part of the squad that won the first-ever national championship for Koper during the 2009–10 season. With Maribor, he won the league championship during the 2010–11 season, his second consecutive championship. Between 2011–12 and 2014–15, Viler won another four consecutive championships with Maribor.

On 21 October 2014, Viler scored an own goal in a 6–0 UEFA Champions League loss to Chelsea, and was substituted minutes later. On 22 August 2017, Viler scored the only goal for Maribor against Hapoel Be'er Sheva in the second leg of the play-off round of the 2017–18 UEFA Champions League, helping his team to qualify for the group stage of the competition for the third time in history.

On 29 December 2020, Maribor retired his squad number 28 until 2030. The next day, Viler returned to Koper after ten years.

After a brief spell with Koper, Viler retired from professional football in November 2021.

Honours
Koper
Slovenian PrvaLiga: 2009–10
Slovenian Cup: 2005–06, 2006–07

Maribor
Slovenian PrvaLiga: 2010–11, 2011–12, 2012–13, 2013–14, 2014–15, 2016–17, 2018–19
Slovenian Cup: 2011–12, 2012–13, 2015–16
Slovenian Supercup: 2012, 2013, 2014

References

External links
Player profile at NZS 

1986 births
Living people
Sportspeople from Koper
Slovenian footballers
Association football fullbacks
Slovenian Second League players
Slovenian PrvaLiga players
FC Koper players
NK Maribor players
Slovenia youth international footballers
Slovenia under-21 international footballers
Slovenia international footballers